Muğdat Çelik (born 3 January 1990) is a Turkish footballer who plays for the TFF Third League club Yeni Mersin İdmanyurdu.

Professional career
On 10 May 2018, Muğdat helped Akhisar Belediyespor win their first professional trophy, the 2017–18 Turkish Cup and assisted his team twice in the final. 

On 12 July 2019, Çelik joined Gazişehir Gaziantep.

Honours
Akhisarspor
 Turkish Cup (1): 2017-18

Galatasaray
 Süper Lig (1): 2018–19
 Turkish Cup (1):  2018–19

References

External links

1990 births
People from Mersin
Living people
Turkish footballers
Association football forwards
Gençlerbirliği S.K. footballers
Kastamonuspor footballers
Batman Petrolspor footballers
Nazilli Belediyespor footballers
Balıkesirspor footballers
Akhisarspor footballers
Galatasaray S.K. footballers
Gaziantep F.K. footballers
Kayserispor footballers
Denizlispor footballers
Süper Lig players
TFF First League players
TFF Second League players
TFF Third League players